Gerda Steyn (born 3 March 1990) is a South African marathon and ultramarathon athlete. She set the Comrades Marathon up-run record in 2019 with a mark of 5:58:53, becoming the first woman under 6 hours for that race.

On 11 April 2021, she became the SA marathon record holder with a time of 2:25:28 at the Xiamen Tuscany Camp Elite Marathon in Siena, Italy.

Early life 
Her parents are Pieter and Trudie Steyn. Gerda grew up on a farm in the  Bothaville area and completed her schooling in 2008 at the Bothaville High School. Afterwards, she qualified as a quantity surveyor from the University of the Free State. She has a sister, Estie, and a brother, Stefan.

Career 
In 2014 she went to work in Dubai and joined a running club, where she discovered her talent for running. After completing her first Comrades in 2015, she met 1991 winner Nick Bester who became her coach.

Her first major career victory was in the 2018 Two Oceans Marathon, in a time of 3:39:32.

She won the 2019 up Comrades Marathon in a record time of 5 hours, 58 minutes and 53 seconds, becoming the first woman to complete the up run in under six hours.

She also won the 2019 Two Oceans Marathon in a time of 3:31:28.

She competed in the women's marathon at the 2020 Summer Olympics.

Her best time for a standard marathon is the SA record of 2:25:28, achieved in 2021 at the 2021 IAAF Xiamen Tuscany Camp Elite Marathon in Siena, Italy, breaking the previous 25-year-old SA record by more than a minute.

Results

References 

Living people
1990 births
South African female long-distance runners
South African female marathon runners
People from Lejweleputswa District Municipality
Athletes (track and field) at the 2020 Summer Olympics
Olympic athletes of South Africa
University of the Free State alumni